Nipissing District is a district in Northeastern Ontario in the Canadian province of Ontario. It was created in 1858. The district seat is North Bay.

In 2016, the population was 83,150.

History
The Sudbury District was created in 1894 from townships of eastern Algoma District and west Nipissing District. The Timiskaming District was created in 1912 from parts of Algoma, Nipissing, and Sudbury Districts.

Subdivisions

City
 North Bay

Towns
 Mattawa 
 Temagami 
West Nipissing

In addition, the eastern part of the town of Kearney is within Nipissing District, but the entire town is enumerated with the Parry Sound District.

Townships
 Bonfield 
 Calvin
 Chisholm
 East Ferris
 Mattawan
 Papineau-Cameron
 South Algonquin

Unorganized areas
North Part
South Part

Local services boards in these unorganized areas include:
Redbridge
Thorne
Tilden Lake

First Nation reserves

Bear Island 1
Nipissing 10

Demographics

See also

 Census divisions of Ontario
 List of townships in Ontario
 List of secondary schools in Ontario#Nipissing District

References